Forty people were killed and another eight were injured in a bus crash near the town of Monteforte Irpino in Italy on July 28, 2013.

Accident
The bus carrying pilgrims to their home from a visit to a Catholic shrine fell nearly 100 feet off the bridge on a road east of Naples. The bus carried nearly 50 passengers.

See also
List of traffic collisions (2000–present)

References

2013 in Italy
Monteforte Irpino bus crash
Bus incidents in Italy
July 2013 events in Italy
Province of Avellino